Monaco does not have a visa policy of its own and the Schengen Visa policy applies. Although Monaco is not part of the European Union, or the Schengen Agreement, its territory is part of the Schengen Area by virtue of its customs Union with France as a result of the "Convention on Good Neighbourly Relations of 18 May 1963 on the entry, stay and establishment of foreigners in Monaco" between France and Monaco. The 1963 convention was adapted to allow Monaco to be administered within the Schengen Area as if it were part of France.

The entry and stay of foreigners in Monaco is defined by the Ordinance n. 3.153 of 19 March 1964 concerning the conditions of entry and residence of foreigners in the Principality. Both French and Monégasque authorities carry out checks at Monaco's seaport and heliport.

Diplomatic and service categories passports
Visa policy for holders of diplomatic and service passports in the Schengen area is not unified. The visa policy of Monaco for holders of diplomatic and service passports is identical to the visa policy of France, but differs from other Schengen countries.

In addition to nations whose all citizens are visa exempt, holders of diplomatic or service category passports of Algeria, Angola, Bahrain, Bolivia, Cabo Verde, Dominican Republic, Ecuador, Gabon, Indonesia, Kuwait, Morocco, Oman, Qatar, Saudi Arabia, South Africa, Tunisia, Turkey, United States (provided not travelling on duty) and only diplomatic passports of Armenia, Azerbaijan, Belize, Benin (biometric only), China, Congo (biometric only), India, Jordan, Kazakhstan, Kyrgyzstan, Mongolia, Namibia, Russia, Senegal, Thailand and Vietnam also do not require a visa.

Long term stay

Foreigners that desire to stay for a period longer than 3 months in Monaco require a resident permit.

Souvenir passport stamp

When visiting Monaco, there is no passport control except of when coming from a Schengen country. Visitors were previously able to get souvenir passport stamps at a state tourism office. Official passports are no longer stamped as this may cause difficulties with validity. Instead, a special 'souvenir passport' is available free of charge, in which these stamps may instead be placed.

See also

Visa requirements for Monégasque citizens
Visa policy of the Schengen Area
List of diplomatic missions of Monaco
Foreign relations of Monaco

References

Foreign relations of Monaco
Monaco